Two submarines of the United States Navy have been named USS Tunny, for the tunny, any of several oceanic fishes resembling the mackerel.

United States Navy ship names